Interscope Communications (also known as Interscope Pictures) was a motion picture production company founded in 1982 by Ted Field. It soon became a division of PolyGram Filmed Entertainment.

History
Interscope Communications was founded in 1982 by media mogul Ted Field, who aimed to create films with mass appeal. Field acted as a producer or executive producer on a number of films in Interscope's filmography. The company's first film, Revenge of the Nerds, was released in 1984 and was a box office success. That same year, Robert W. Cort, a former executive of 20th Century Fox and Columbia Pictures, joined Interscope and became the president of the company. Cort also co-produced a number of films.

On November 13, 1984, the company received an agreement with The Walt Disney Studios for a two-year term, to become the company's first independent supplier within the studio, after several years working with an agreement at 20th Century-Fox in order that Interscope would finance films for the studio.

On December 10, 1986, Interscope Communications inked a three-picture domestic feature pact with United Artists Pictures, whereas production would be jointly financed by UA and Interscope, and that Interaccess Film Distribution and Vestron Inc. would participate in Interscope's share of financing, and domestic videocassette rights to Interscope's features going to Vestron Video, and foreign theatrical, TV and home video distribution of Interscope's films going to Interaccess Film Distribution.

On May 20, 1987, Interscope Communications rises into the rank as a film supplier, in order to set films from different major film studios, mostly MPAA members, which included five of the films that were donated by Interscope to the major motion picture studios, such as Touchstone Pictures, Tri-Star Pictures, Warner Bros., Orion Pictures, 20th Century Fox and De Laurentiis Entertainment Group, as well as his involvement with a $1 million in-house development kitty.

In early July 1987, Interscope Communications decided to accelerate its TV production phase from four productions from its first four years of existence to a slate of 13 new projects for the next eighteen months, and which include two movies-of-the week, a miniseries and a conventional series for NBC, and Patricia Clifford runs the company's television operations for Interscope's television division, acknowledged a markedly pronounced greater receptivity than in previous years to telefilms dealing with black experience in the U.S., and offered a series of failed pilots and television movies on the air.

In 1990, Nomura Babcock & Brown (NBB) invested $250 million in a joint venture with The Walt Disney Company and Interscope Communications.  The deal called for NBB to co-produce and finance films for Interscope and Disney for four years.  The joint venture produced five films between 1992 and 1995, all of which were marketed and released under two of Disney's production banners, Touchstone Pictures and Hollywood Pictures. The most successful film co-produced by Interscope and NBB was The Hand That Rocks the Cradle (1992), while other films produced by the joint venture were critical and commercial failures.

Also that year, it purchased Marble Arch Productions from ITC, and decided that ITC Entertainment would co-finance the projects for U.S. and foreign distribution.

PolyGram
In 1992, PolyGram bought a controlling interest in Interscope Communications' film unit. Production and marketing budgets were to be paid by PolyGram. Robert W. Cort, president of Interscope, left the company at the end of 1995 believing that PolyGram "took on much more of a corporate environment than it had before and that consequently his role had become more like an executive's than a producer's." Field purchased Cort's 12% stake in the corporation.

Beginning in 1996, Interscope began using PFE's PolyGram Filmed Entertainment Distribution for distribution. In 1998, after PolyGram was bought by Universal Studios, Interscope's film unit was retained as a subsidiary of Universal until it was shut down in 2003. Interscope Records however, still exists as part of Universal Music Group (whose predecessor MCA purchased Atlantic's stake in the label in 1995).

Filmography
Interscope Communications has produced 56 films. Of the 56 films produced, only 14 are direct-to-video or made-for-television productions. Currently, all of the films that Interscope produced for Orion Pictures, and De Laurentiis Entertainment Group between 1989 and 1991, as well as PolyGram Filmed Entertainment and Gramercy Pictures before March 31, 1996, are owned by Metro-Goldwyn-Mayer, which acquired the studios in separate transactions. Films produced for PolyGram or Gramercy after April 1, 1996, are now owned by Universal Studios. Note that in all cases the distributor or distributors are also co-producers. The box office column reflects the worldwide gross for the theatrical release of the films in United States dollars.

1 Direct-to-video release.
2 Released as a made-for-television film

References

Mass media companies established in 1982
Mass media companies disestablished in 2003
Defunct American film studios
Film production companies of the United States
1982 establishments in the United States
Universal Pictures